Eugene Irving Gordon  (September 14, 1930 – September 15, 2014) was an American physicist.  He was Director of the Lightwave Devices Laboratory of Bell Labs.

Biography
Gordon was born on September 14, 1930 in New York City. He graduated from the City College of New York in 1952 with a B.S. in physics, and completed his Ph.D. from the Massachusetts Institute of Technology in 1957. He became director of the Lightwave Devices Laboratory of Bell Labs. He married Renate Albrecht on December 31, 1991. He died on September 15, 2014 in Scotch Plains, New Jersey.

Honors and awards
 IEEE Edison Medal in 1984 
 member, National Academy of Engineering in 1978
 IEEE Vladimir K. Zworykin Award in 1975 
 Fellow, IEEE 1968

References

1930 births
2014 deaths
American physicists
Fellow Members of the IEEE
Members of the United States National Academy of Engineering
IEEE Edison Medal recipients
Scientists from New York City
City College of New York alumni
MIT Department of Physics alumni